Yanaturmysh is a village in Almaty Region of south-eastern Kazakhstan. It is located in the Enbekshikazakh District, approximately 75 kilometres north-east of Almaty.

Populated places in Almaty Region